The eighteenth season of the American competitive reality television series Hell's Kitchen (subtitled as Hell's Kitchen: Rookies vs. Veterans) premiered on Fox on September 28, 2018. Gordon Ramsay returned as host and head chef, and season 10 winner Christina Wilson and British MasterChef judge James "Jocky" Petrie returned as the red and blue sous chefs, respectively, alongside maître d'hôtel Marino Monferrato.  This season featured eight new contestants battling eight returning veterans. For the first time, the winner of this season received a position as an executive chef at Gordon Ramsay Hell's Kitchen Restaurant at Caesars Palace in Las Vegas, Nevada.

Ariel Contreras-Fox, who previously finished in third place on season six, won the competition.

Chefs
Sixteen chefs competed in season 18.

Rookies

Veterans

Notes

Contestant progress

Episodes

References 

Hell's Kitchen (American TV series)
2018 American television seasons
2019 American television seasons